Sangre Latina is the second studio album recorded by Puerto Rican performer Chayanne, It was released by RCA Ariola in 1986, this last album by record label. The album was produced again by José Antonio Álvarez Alija.

Track listing

Music videos
Vuelve
Una Foto Para Dos
Jana

External links

1986 albums
Chayanne albums
Spanish-language albums
RCA Records albums